Fishburn Airfield is a small grass strip airfield in Fishburn, County Durham.

The airfield was opened on 30 June 1995 by the then local MP and Leader of the Opposition Tony Blair. It was named as "Airfield of the year" by aviation magazine Flyer in 2004 for its welcoming atmosphere and bacon butties.

In 2005 the airfield hosted filming for a scene from the Bollywood film Hari Puttar: A Comedy of Terrors

References

Buildings and structures in County Durham
Airports in North East England